Mexico City Metro Line 9 is one of the 12 metro lines built in Mexico City, Mexico.

General information
Line 9 was the 8th metro line to be built in the network, built between 1985 and 1988. (Line 8 started operations until 1994). It is identified by the color dark brown, and runs from East to West in an almost straight fashion. It was built in order to support Line 1, providing a redistribution alternative for east–west commuters. It starts in the multi-line transfer station Pantitlán and ends at the western neighborhood of Tacubaya, both stations also served by Line 1. As a comparison, the section between Pantitlán and Tacubaya is served by 19 stations in Line 1, whereas Line 9 has only 12, which would translate in a faster alternative.

Line 9 is built in its easternmost section above the Rio Churubusco and Rio de la Piedad Avenues. Then it reaches an underground route near the Magdalena Mixiuhca Complex and it continues under the Eje 3 Sur until reaching the Tacubaya zone, where the last station is built under Jalisco avenue. As part of the first expansion plans in the 1980s the line is expected to turn west after Jalisco Avenue to reach Observatorio Station.

Chronology
26 August 1987: from Pantitlán to Centro Médico.
29 August 1988: from Centro Médico to Tacubaya.

Rolling stock
Line 8 has had different types of rolling stock throughout the years.

Alstom MP-68: 1987–1996; 1996–2008 CAF: 2018–present
Concarril NM-73: 1987–2008
Concarril NM-79: 2008–present 
Alstom MP-82: 1987–1994 
Bombardier NC-82: 2008–present
Concarril NM-83: 2013–present
CAF NE-92 2018–present

As of 2020, out of the 390 trains in the Mexico City Metro network, 29 are in service in Line 9.

Station list 

The stations from west to east: 
{| class="wikitable" rules="all"
|-
!rowspan="2" | No.
!rowspan="2" | Station
!rowspan="2" | Date opened
!rowspan="2" | Level
!colspan="2" | Distance (km)
!rowspan="2" | Connection
!Pictogram
!rowspan="2" | Location
|-
!style="font-size: 65%;"|Betweenstations
!style="font-size: 65%;"|Total
!Description
|-
|style="background: #; color: white;"|01
|Pantitlán 
| rowspan="9" |August 26, 1987
| rowspan="4" |Elevated, overground access
|style="text-align:right;"|-
|style="text-align:right;"|0.0
|
  Line 1 (out of service)
  Line 5
  Line A
 Pantitlán
  Line 4 (Alameda Oriente branch): Pantitlán station
  Line III: Pantitlán station (temporary Line1 service)
 Route: 168 (temporary Line1 service)
  Line 2: Pantitlán stop
 Routes: 11-B, 11-C, 19-F, 19-G
|Pantitlán is a Nahuatl word that means between flags. In Aztec times, this place was part of Lake Texcoco. There was a culvert where the whirlpools came with such force that the canoes were carried away, so they fenced the place by putting up two posts, and as a warning to the navigators, the flags. The icon of the station represents two flags in reference to the navigation notices that the Aztecs placed in Lake Texcoco.
|rowspan="3"| Iztacalco / Venustiano Carranza
|-
|style="background: #; color: white;"|02
|Puebla 
|style="text-align:right;"|1.5
|style="text-align:right;"|1.5
|
  Line 2: Puebla stop
 Routes: 9-D, 9-E, 19-E, 19-H
|It is located in the Puebla district of the Iztacalco delegation of Mexico City; both the area it is located in and the station are named for the nearby city of Puebla. The station logo represents some angels, as the city is commonly called The City of Angels.
|-
|style="background: #; color: white;"|03
|Ciudad Deportiva 
|style="text-align:right;"|0.9
|style="text-align:right;"|2.4
|
  Line 2: Ciudad Deportiva stop
 Route: 9-E
|It is named for the nearby the Magdalena Mixhuca Sports City. The logo for the station represents a player engaged in a Mesoamerican ballgame (a similar logo is used for Metro Deportivo 18 de Marzo on lines 3 and 6).
|-
|style="background: #; color: white;"|04
|Velódromo 
|style="text-align:right;"|1.3
|style="text-align:right;"|3.7
|
  Line 2: Velódromo stop
 Routes: 9-E, 14-A
|It is named after the nearby Agustín Melgar Olympic Velodrome, or bicycle-racing venue, built for the 1968 Summer Olympics that were held in Mexico City. The logo for the station shows the silhouette of a bicycle racer.
|-
|style="background: #; color: white;"|05
|Mixiuhca
| rowspan="8" |Underground, trench
|style="text-align:right;"|1.0
|style="text-align:right;"|4.7
|
  Line 5: Mixiuhca station
  Line 2: Mixiuhca stop
 Route: 9-C, 9-E, 14-A
|The station's icon is a silhouette of a woman holding a newborn baby. In the Nahuatl language mixiuhca means "place of births".
|-
|style="background: #; color: white;"|06
|Jamaica 
|style="text-align:right;"|0.9
|style="text-align:right;"|5.6
|
  Line 4
  Line 2: Jamaica stop
 Route: 37
 Routes: 5-A, 9-C (at distance), 9-E (at distance), 14-A (at distance)
|The station logo depicts an ear of corn. Its name refers to the nearby wholesale market of Jamaica.
|
|-
|style="background: #; color: white;"|07
|Chabacano 
|style="text-align:right;"|1.2
|style="text-align:right;"|6.8
|
  Line 2
  Line 8
 Routes: 2-A, 31-B, 33, 111-A, 145-A
 Routes: 9-C, 9-E, 14-A, 17-C, 17-H, 17-I
|The station's pictogram depicts an apricot and it was named after a previously existing street that had multiple apricot trees.
|rowspan="4"|Cuauhtémoc
|-
|style="background: #; color: white;"|08
|Lázaro Cárdenas
|style="text-align:right;"|1.1
|style="text-align:right;"|7.9
|
  Line 1: Lázaro Cárdenas stop
 Routes: 9-C, 9-E
|It receives its name from the Eje Central Lázaro Cárdenas which crosses the Eje 3 sur at that height. Lázaro Cárdenas del Río was president of Mexico from 1934 to 1940. He is famous for being the one who expropriated the foreign companies that extracted Mexican oil (Expropriation Petrolera). He was also the president who helped Spanish refugees during the Spanish Civil War. The station logo shows a portrait in profile of him.
|-
|style="background: #; color: white;"|09
|Centro Médico 
|style="text-align:right;"|1.2
|style="text-align:right;"|9.1
|
  Line 3

  Line 3: Centro Médico station
 Routes: 9-C, 9-E
|The station logo represents the caduceus, a variant of the Rod of Aesculapius, the Greek god of medicine. Its name refers to the Centro Médico Nacional Siglo XXI general hospital, located above the metro station.
|-
|style="background: #; color: white;"|10
|Chilpancingo 
| rowspan="3" |August 29, 1988
|style="text-align:right;"|1.3
|style="text-align:right;"|10.5
|

  Line 1: Chilpancingo station
 Routes: 9-C, 9-E
|The station is named after the nearby Avenida Chilpancingo, which in turn is named after the city of Chilpancingo de los Bravo, the capital of the state of Guerrero. The station logo is the silhouette of a wasp since Chilpancingo means the place of the wasps in Nahuatl.
|-
|style="background: #; color: white;"|11
|Patriotismo 
|style="text-align:right;"|1.1
|style="text-align:right;"|11.6
|
<li>
<li>  Line 2: Patriotismo station
<li> Routes: 13-A, 115-A, 200
<li> Routes: 9-C, 9-E, 21-A
|The station is named after Avenida Patriotismo which divides the Cuauhtémoc and Miguel Hidalgo boroughs. "Patriotismo" literally means patriotism, thus, the station logo depicts a Mexican flag.
|Cuauhtémoc / Miguel Hidalgo
|-
|style="background: #; color: white;"|12
|Tacubaya 
|style="text-align:right;"|1.3
|style="text-align:right;"|12.8
|
<li>  Line 1
<li>  Line 7
<li> Tacubaya
<li> (at distance)
<li>  Line 2: Tacubaya station
<li> Routes: 110, 110-B, 110-C, 112, 113-B, 115, 118, 119, 200
<li> Routes: 1-B, 9-C, 9-E, 21-A
|The station takes its name from the neighborhood it is located in: Tacubaya. The origin of this zone of the city can be traced back to an Aztec settlement, which back then was at the edge of Lake Texcoco. The name Tacubaya is a Spanish barbarism that derived from the Nahuatl Atlacuihuayan, that means "where water joins". Therefore, the station pictogram represents a water bowl, that also resembles the glyph of the Aztec settlement of Tacubaya found at the Codex Mendoza.
|Miguel Hidalgo
|}

Proposed extension 
Being Tacubaya a provisional terminal, Line 9 had an original project for being expanded to the west to reach Observatorio station as Line 1 did. After the announcement for the Toluca–Mexico City commuter rail, an expansion towards Observatorio station was announced in 2014. As of 2021, the project is still under planification.

Ridership
The following table shows each of Line 9 stations total and average daily ridership during 2019.

Tourism
Line 9 passes near several places of interest:

Magdalena Mixhuca Sports City, Olympic Park used for the 1968 Summer Olympics
Palacio de los Deportes, indoor sports arena and concert venue.
Autódromo Hermanos Rodríguez, motorsport race track venue of the Formula One Mexican Grand Prix.
Foro Sol, sports and concert venue.

See also 
 List of Mexico City Metro lines

Notes

References

1987 establishments in Mexico
9
Railway lines opened in 1987